Osmo Juhani Ala-Honkola (12 May 1939 – 14 November 2020) was a Finnish sports shooter. He competed at the 1968 Summer Olympics and the 1972 Summer Olympics.

References

External links
 

1939 births
2020 deaths
Finnish male sport shooters
Olympic shooters of Finland
Shooters at the 1968 Summer Olympics
Shooters at the 1972 Summer Olympics
People from Kuortane
Sportspeople from South Ostrobothnia
20th-century Finnish people